Alexander Wilson  (171416 October 1786) was a Scottish surgeon, type-founder, astronomer, mathematician and meteorologist. He was the first scientist to use kites in meteorological investigations.

In 1784, his son Patrick Wilson succeeded him as Regius Professor of Practical Astronomy at the University of Glasgow.

Early life
Wilson was born in St Andrews, Fife, the son of Patrick Wilson, the town clerk. Alexander was educated at the University of St Andrews, graduating in 1733, aged 18, with an MA.

He was first apprenticed to a physician in St Andrews where he became skilled in constructing mercury thermometers in glass. In 1737, he left for London to make his fortune, He found work as assistant to a French surgeon-apothecary, which included caring for his patients. During this time he was introduced to Lord Isla who like Wilson was interested in astronomy, and Wilson constructed instruments for Isla during 1738.

After visiting a type foundry with a friend in London, he had an idea for making better typefaces. He and his friend John Baine returned to St Andrews in 1739, where they started a type foundry business in 1742. For example, in 1756 Wilson Greek typefaces were used to print classics of Greek literature.

University of Glasgow
The company moved to Camlachie, near Glasgow in 1744. In 1748 he was appointed type-founder to the University of Glasgow. In the following year the partnership with Baine was dissolved. Later his sons became partners. He supplied types to the Foulis press making possible beautiful and artistic publications. Among modern typefaces, Fontana, Scotch Roman, and Wilson Greek are based on types cut by Wilson.

In 1749 Wilson made the first recorded use of kites in meteorology with his lodger, a 23-year-old University of Glasgow student Thomas Melvill. They measured air temperature at various levels above the ground simultaneously with a train of kites. Melvill went on to discover sodium light. Wilson was the inventor of hydrostatic bubbles, a form of hydrometer, in 1757. 

With the help of his friend Lord Isla, now the 3rd Duke of Argyle, Wilson was appointed in 1760 to the new chair of practical astronomy at the University of Glasgow, which had recently built the Macfarlane Observatory. Wilson primarily made contributions to astronomy and meteorology, and posited that "what hinders the fixed stars from falling upon one another", the question that Newton had posed in his Opticks (1704), was that the entire universe rotated around its centre.

Wilson noted that sunspots viewed near the edge of the Sun's visible disk appear depressed below the solar surface, a phenomenon referred to as the Wilson effect. When the Royal Danish Academy of Sciences and Letters announced a prize to be awarded for the best essay on the nature of solar spots, Wilson submitted an entry. On 18 February 1772 the Academy presented Wilson with a gold medal for his work on sunspots.

The crater Wilson on the Moon is named for him, Ralph Elmer Wilson and CTR Wilson.

He, and his second son Patrick Wilson, were two of the founding members of the Royal Society of Edinburgh (RSE). Patrick wrote a biographical article of his father which was published both in the Transactions of the RSE and Edinburgh Journal of Science.

In 1783 he was a joint founder of the Royal Society of Edinburgh. He died in Edinburgh on 16 October 1786.

References

 Royal Society of Edinburgh Retrieved 10 Mar 2009
 Williamson, Peter & Woodby, John, 'Scottish Book Trade Index (SBTI)', National Library of Scotland' Retrieved 19 Dec 2008
 Smith, George Fairfull, "Robert & Andrew Foulis, the Foulis Press, and Their Legacy", Retrieved 19 Dec 2008.
 Stronach, George, rev. Hutchins, Roger, "Wilson, Alexander (1714–1786)", Oxford Dictionary of National Biography, Oxford University Press, 2004, Retrieved 19 Dec 2008
 Wilson, Alexander (1774) "Observations on Solar Spots", Philosophical Transactions of the Royal Society of London 64, part I.
 

1714 births
1786 deaths
People from St Andrews
18th-century British astronomers
18th-century Scottish mathematicians
18th-century Scottish scientists
18th-century Scottish medical doctors
Alumni of the University of St Andrews
Academics of the University of Glasgow
Founder Fellows of the Royal Society of Edinburgh
Members of the Philosophical Society of Edinburgh
Scottish pharmacists
British typographers and type designers
Scottish astronomers
18th-century Scottish businesspeople
Scottish designers
Scottish inventors
Scottish surgeons
Scottish meteorologists
British scientific instrument makers